Unforgivable may refer to:

 Unforgivable (1996 film), a 1996 American television drama film
 Unforgivable (2011 film), the English title of 2011 French drama film Impardonnables
 The Unforgivable, a 2021 American-German drama film
 Unforgivable sins
 "Unforgivable" (song), a 2009 song by Armin van Buuren featuring Jaren

See also